Philadelphia Mills (formerly and still referred to as Franklin Mills) is an enclosed shopping mall in Northeast Philadelphia, bordering Bensalem in Bucks County and  from Center City.  Formerly named for Benjamin Franklin, the mall is home to 125 stores, a movie theatre, a food court, and seven theme restaurants and was visited by an estimated 18 million people in 2006. The anchor stores are Dave & Buster's, Forever 21, Urban Planet, Saks Fifth Avenue, Marshalls, HomeGoods, American Freight, Walmart, AMC Theatres, and Burlington. Three currently vacant anchor stores once housed Phar-Mor, JCPenney, and Modell's Sporting Goods.

Opened in 1989, Franklin Mills was the second built and formerly owned by the Mills Corporation and is now managed by the Simon Property Group.  Along with the King of Prussia mall, Simon has control of Pennsylvania's two largest malls.

On September 16, 2014, Simon Property Group renamed the mall from Franklin Mills to Philadelphia Mills.

With 200 stores, Philadelphia Mills is currently the second largest shopping mall in Pennsylvania.

Location
The Philadelphia Mills site was formerly home to Liberty Bell Park Racetrack. It is located about a mile west of Interstate 95, at the intersection of Woodhaven Road (Pennsylvania Route 63) and Knights Road.

Branding and design

Philadelphia Mills mall is designed in the shape of a thunderbolt in commemoration of Benjamin Franklin's kite-and-key experiment. The mall's former logo, when it was called Franklin Mills, included a red kite with a lightning bolt on the right side and the string ending on the letter "A" of "FRANKLIN". The mall is separated by its four Neighborhoods: Red, Blue, Yellow, and Green, and has six main entries including its neighborhood color entries, plus Aqua at the Grand Court and the Orange entry in its Green Neighborhood near the former Steve & Barry's. There are also entries at either side of the AMC 14 theater for moviegoers after mall hours. So far, the mall's Red, Green, and Orange entrances have been renovated to look modern. However, the Blue and Yellow entrances have been constructed, but are still unfinished.

The mall is the first Mills mall to have two food courts. "Cafe Court", at Red Neighborhood 1, is anchored by GAP. "Cafe Freedom", a larger food court at Green Neighborhood 4, was, as of early 2016, renamed "Dining Pavilion" and has undergone renovations. The mall once had graphics, usually hanging from the ceiling, but in the later years, they were removed. The mall also previously had two video courts; one was removed in the 2000s, and another one which was removed in August 2014. From the mall's opening until 2012, an animatronic likeness of Benjamin Franklin's face hung from the ceiling at the Grand Court between Neighborhoods Blue & Yellow, which would announce the time hourly.  Almost all main mall entries have a graphic at its entry. Throughout the mall, there were several sets of projection TVs hanging from the ceiling known as "Mills TV", showing video loops of music videos and advertisements. As of the early 2010s however, they were replaced by double-faced Daktronics LED boards.

The  mall consists primarily of factory outlet stores. As of Early 2021, the surviving major anchor tenants included Marshalls and Burlington. When the mall first opened in 1989 the original anchors were JCPenney; Sears; Ports of the World, Reading China and Glass, and Phar-Mor.  Over time, the Ports was re-branded as Boscov's, and was later replaced by Steve & Barry's.  Reading China & Glass closed and its building was split between Marshalls and OfficeMax.  Sears Outlet left the mall for the first time and was replaced by General Cinema, itself acquired by AMC Theatres.  OfficeMax later left the mall, and Sears Outlet returned taking the OfficeMax space.  Original stores remaining in the mall include Bed, Bath and Beyond & Modell's, which have been joined by Forever 21, Last Call, H&M, & Off 5th and Walmart.  On December 15, 2011, it was announced that JCPenney would be returning to the mall as a department store, in its original location; the outlet store had been closed as part of a nationwide realignment by the retailer of all its outlet stores. On March 17, 2017, JCPenney announced that its store would be closing as part of a plan to close 138 stores nationwide; the store closed on July 31, 2017. As of September 2020, Sears Outlet has rebranded as American Freight.

Notable incidents 
On Black Friday 2013 at around 2:30 AM, a fight broke out in the mall involving a taser gun and two women. Nobody was injured however the two were kicked out of the mall shortly after security broke up the fight.

In late 2016 in the wake of violent flash mobs happening around the country, one of them occurred in the mall on December 27, 2016 when a group of around 30 teens flash mobbed and started fights in the food court, reportedly attacking a police officer. Four teens ended up getting arrested.

In May 2020, in the wake of the George Floyd protests, police surrounded the areas of the mall and barricading it to prevent any looting or raids after it was learned that a group of people were planning to raid the mall.

During early 2021, two shootings occurred in the mall. One of them occurred on February 7, 2021 when a 21 year old man was shot in the neck at around noon. The cause of the shooting was unknown and the victim was reported to be in "stable condition" after being taken to a local hospital. Another one occurred on March 29, 2021 when a fight broke out in the mall's "Dining Pavilion" food court which resulted in a shooting, killing one person. The mall was placed on lockdown following the shooting. The stepson of a local detective was killed.

References

External links

 Philadelphia Mills
 Simon Property Group

Shopping malls in Pennsylvania
Simon Property Group
Outlet malls in the United States
Buildings and structures in Philadelphia
Shopping malls established in 1989
Economy of Philadelphia
Northeast Philadelphia